1301 Yvonne is a carbonaceous background asteroid from the background population of the intermediate asteroid belt, approximately  in diameter. It was discovered on 7 March 1934, by French astronomer Louis Boyer at the Algiers Observatory in North Africa. The asteroid was named for the discoverer's sister, Yvonne Boyer

Orbit and classification 

Yvonne is a non-family of the main belt's background population. It orbits the Sun in the central asteroid belt at a distance of 2.0–3.5 AU once every 4 years and 7 months (1,682 days; semi-major axis of 2.77 AU). Its orbit has an eccentricity of 0.27 and an inclination of 34° with respect to the ecliptic. The body's observation arc begins with its official discovery observation at Algiers in March 1934.

Naming 

This minor planet was named after Yvonne Boyer, sister of discoverer. The official naming citation was mentioned in The Names of the Minor Planets by Paul Herget in 1955.

Physical characteristics 

In the SMASS classification, Yvonne is a carbonaceous C-type asteroid. PanSTARRS photometric survey also characterized the asteroid as a C-type.

Rotation period and pole 

Between 2003 and 2017, four rotational lightcurves of Yvonne have been obtained from photometric observations. Analysis gave a consolidated rotation period of 7.320 hours with a brightness amplitude between 0.52 and 0.90 magnitude. In 2011, a modeled lightcurve using data from the Uppsala Asteroid Photometric Catalogue (UAPC) and other sources gave a concurring period  hours, as well as a spin axis of (39.0°, 41.0°) in ecliptic coordinates (λ, β).

Diameter and albedo 

According to the surveys carried out by the Infrared Astronomical Satellite IRAS, the Japanese Akari satellite and the NEOWISE mission of NASA's Wide-field Infrared Survey Explorer, Yvonne measures between 18.693 and 22.77 kilometers in diameter and its surface has an albedo between 0.10 and 0.201.

The Collaborative Asteroid Lightcurve Link derives an albedo of 0.1054 (which is untypically high for a carbonaceous body) and a diameter of 22.50 kilometers based on an absolute magnitude of 11.3.

References

External links 
 Lightcurve Database Query (LCDB), at www.minorplanet.info
 Dictionary of Minor Planet Names, Google books
 Asteroids and comets rotation curves, CdR – Geneva Observatory, Raoul Behrend
 Discovery Circumstances: Numbered Minor Planets (1)-(5000) – Minor Planet Center
 
 

001301
Discoveries by Louis Boyer (astronomer)
Named minor planets
001301
19340307